Felipe da Silva Surian (born 3 October 1981), known as Felipe Surian, is a Brazilian football coach and former player who played as a central defender. He is the current head coach of Portuguesa-RJ.

Career
Born in Juiz de Fora, Minas Gerais, Surian was an América Mineiro youth graduate. He then played for several clubs in his native state before retiring with Tupi in 2007.

In 2008, Surian became Tupi's assistant manager, and was also interim manager in 2012. Definitely appointed manager for the 2013 season, he led the club to their promotion to the Campeonato Brasileiro Série C.

In 2014, Surian was in charge of Anápolis and Caldense, and returned to Tupi for the 2015 campaign. In that year, he also managed Villa Nova.

On 1 December 2015, Surian took over Volta Redonda, and won the Campeonato Brasileiro Série D with the club. He was subsequently named at the helm of América de Natal, but returned to Voltaço in March 2017.

Honours
Volta Redonda
 Campeonato Brasileiro Série D: 2016 
 Taça Rio: 2016

References

External links

1981 births
Living people
People from Juiz de Fora
Brazilian footballers
Association football defenders
Tupi Football Club players
Brazilian football managers
Campeonato Brasileiro Série C managers
Campeonato Brasileiro Série D managers
Tupi Football Club managers
Anápolis Futebol Clube managers
Associação Atlética Caldense managers
Villa Nova Atlético Clube managers
Volta Redonda Futebol Clube managers
América Futebol Clube (RN) managers
Uberlândia Esporte Clube managers
Tupynambás Futebol Clube managers
Joinville Esporte Clube managers
Associação Atlética Portuguesa (RJ) managers
Sampaio Corrêa Futebol Clube managers
Sportspeople from Minas Gerais